Frank Bestow Wiborg (April 30, 1855 – May 12, 1930) was a businessman from Cincinnati who, with Levi Addison Ault, created the ink manufacturer Ault & Wiborg Company.

Biography

He was born on April 30, 1855, to Henry Paulinus Wiborg, a Norwegian immigrant, and Susan Isidora Bestow. He attended the Chickering Scientific and Classical Institute, and graduated in 1874. He worked for Levi Ault to pay his way through school.

After graduating, Ault and Wiborg became business partners, founding the Ault & Wiborg printing ink company. By 40, he was a multimillionaire.

He married Adeline Moulton Sherman (1859-1917), the daughter of Hoyt Sherman, in 1882. Together they had three daughters: Mary Hoyt Wiborg, Sara Sherman Wiborg, and Olga Wiborg (1890-1937). Olga Wiborg married Sidney Webster Fish, the son of Stuyvesant Fish on September 18, 1915, in St. Luke's Episcopal Church in Easthampton, New York. On December 30, 1915, Sara married Gerald Murphy. 

The Wiborg family spent summer vacations in the Hamptons, renting rooms and cottages in Amagansett and East Hampton Village before purchasing land from Mrs. Marshall Smith in spring 1909. He expanded an existing cottage and eventually built a 30-room stucco mansion, the Dunes, that was among the largest in the area.

Frank Wiborg later became the Assistant Secretary of Commerce and Labor in the Taft administration.

He died of pneumonia at his home at 756 Park Avenue in New York City on May 12, 1930.

Writings
The Travels of an Unofficial Attaché (Privately printed, 1904)
A Commercial Traveller in South America (New York: McClure, Phillips & Co. 1905)
Printing Ink: A History with a Treatise on Modern Methods of Manufacture and Use (New York and London: Harper, 1926)

Archive
Frank Wiborg's diaries can be found in the Gerald and Sara Murphy Papers, Beinecke Rare Book and Manuscript Library, Yale University.

See also
Gerald and Sara Murphy

References

1855 births
1930 deaths
People from East Hampton (town), New York
American people of Norwegian descent
Deaths from pneumonia in New York City